Gonja (also Ghanjawiyyu, endonym Ngbanya) was a kingdom in northern Ghana founded in 1675 by Sumaila Ndewura Jakpa. The word can also refer to the people of this kingdom.

Origin
The Gonja are a Guan people who have been influenced by Dagbon, Akan, Mande and Hausa people. With the fall of the Songhai Empire (c. 1600), the Mande Ngbanya clan moved south, crossing the Black Volta and founding a city at Yagbum. The Gonja kingdom was originally divided into sections overseen by male siblings of Sumaila Ndewura Jakpa including their children and grandchildren.

Under the leadership of Naba'a, the Ngbanya dynasty of Gonja was founded. The capital was established at Yagbum.

The Ngbanya expanded rapidly, conquering several neighbors in the White Volta valley and beginning a profitable gold trade with the Akan states through nearby Begho. By 1675, the Gonja established a paramount chief, called the Yagbongwura, to control the kingdom. The Ngbanya dynasty has controlled this position from its founding to the present day, with only two brief interregnums.  The current Yagbongwura, Tuntumba Sulemana Jakpa Bore Essa, has held his position since 2010.

Precolonial Gonja society was stratified into castes, with a ruling class, a Muslim trader class, an animist commoner class, and a slave class. Its economy depended largely on trade in slaves from Central Africa<ref>The Evolution of War: A Study of Its Role in Early Societies' by Maurice R. Davie</ref> and kola nuts, particularly through the market town of Salaga, sometimes called the "Timbuktu of the South."

The Gonja language, properly called Ngbanya or Ngbanyito, is a Tano language within the Kwa languages family, closely related to Akan languages.

See also
Rulers of the Northern state of Gonja

References
 Jack Goody, "The social organisation of the LoWiili", Oxford University Press, 1956
 Jack Goody, The Ethnology of the Northern Territories of the Gold Coast, West of the White Volta, 1958
 Jack Goody, Death, Property and the Ancestors: A study of the mortuary customs of the Lodagaa of West Africa, Stanford, Stanford University Press, 1962
 Jack Goody and J.A. Braimah, "Salaga: The Struggle for Power", London, Longmans, 1967
 Jack Goody, The Myth of the Bagre, Oxford University Press, 1972
Goody, Esther and Jack Goody.  "The Circulation of Women and Children in Northern Ghana."  Man, New Series. 2.2 (1967): 226-248.
Wilks, Ivor.  "Wangara, Akan and Portuguese in the Fifteenth and Sixteenth Centuries II: The Struggle for Trade." Journal of African History'' 23:4 (1982): 463-472.

External links
Ethnologue entry on Gonja language
 Gonja Association of North America
 Official website of the Gonja Association of Ghana

Ethnic groups in Ghana
History of Ghana